The 2021 Jockey Made in America 250 was a NASCAR Cup Series race held on July 4, 2021, at Road America in Elkhart Lake, Wisconsin. Contested over 62 laps on the  road course, it was the 20th race of the 2021 NASCAR Cup Series season.

Report

Background

Road America is a motorsport road course located near Elkhart Lake, Wisconsin on Wisconsin Highway 67. It has hosted races since the 1950s and currently hosts races in the NASCAR Xfinity Series, NTT Indycar Series, NTTWeatherTech SportsCar Championship, SCCA Pirelli World Challenge, ASRA, AMA Superbike series, IndyCar Series, and SCCA Pro Racing's Trans-Am Series.

In June 2020, it was reported that Road America was in negotiations to host the Cup Series in 2021. When NASCAR revealed the 2021 Cup Series schedule on September 30, 2020, Road America was included on the Fourth of July weekend. Following the late addition of the O'Reilly Auto Parts 253 at Daytona International Speedway, Road America became one of seven road courses on the 2021 Cup calendar, the most in series history. Wisconsin-based Kwik Trip was announced as the presenting sponsor for the race on April 13, 2021, which would be called it the "Road America 250 presented by Kwik Trip". However, on May 12, 2021, the clothing company Jockey, also headquartered in Wisconsin, was announced as the title sponsor for the race, which would be known as the "Jockey Made in America 250 presented by Kwik Trip."

Entry list
 (R) denotes rookie driver.
 (i) denotes driver who are ineligible for series driver points.

Practice

Practice results

Qualifying

Qualifying results

Race

William Byron won the pole in qualifying. Early, Ryan Preece suffered an blown engine and Daniel Suárez came to a stop on the track due to a broken transmission. Bryon won the first stage while Tyler Reddick won the second stage. At the beginning of the third stage, Austin Cindric was leading and suffered a gearing issue. Chase Elliott would take the lead from Matt DiBenedetto and hold off Christopher Bell for his second win of the season and his seventh road course win, putting him third behind Tony Stewart (8) and Jeff Gordon (9).

Stage Results

Stage One
Laps: 14

Stage Two
Laps: 15

Final Stage Results

Stage Three
Laps: 33

Race statistics
 Lead changes: 10 among 8 different drivers
 Cautions/Laps: 4 for 9
 Red flags: 0
 Time of race: 2 hours, 54 minutes and 33 seconds
 Average speed:

Media

Television
NBC Sports covered the race on the television side. Rick Allen, Jeff Burton, Steve Letarte and Dale Earnhardt Jr. called the race from the broadcast booth. Dave Burns, Parker Kligerman and Marty Snider handled the pit road duties from pit lane. Jac Collinsworth handled the features from the track.

Radio
Radio coverage of the race was broadcast by Motor Racing Network (MRN) and simulcast on Sirius XM NASCAR Radio.

Standings after the race

Drivers' Championship standings

Manufacturers' Championship standings

Note: Only the first 16 positions are included for the driver standings.
. – Driver has clinched a position in the NASCAR Cup Series playoffs.

References

Jockey Made in America 250
NASCAR races at Road America
Jockey Made in America 250
Jockey Made in America 250